The Gaižiūnai Forest is a forest in Jonava District Municipality and Kaišiadorys District Municipality, central Lithuania. It covers 290 km2 area and it is the seventh largest forest in Lithuania. The KK143 highway passes through the forest.

Forest covers area in two municipalities and three elderships: Rukla Eldership and Šveicarija Eldership in Jonava District Municipality and Palomenė Eldership in Kaišiadorys District Municipality.

Rivers starting in and going through the Gaižiūnai forest: Ruklelė, Taurosta, Varpė, Laukysta, Lomena, Dumsė, Romatas, Šešuva, Želva, Garšas, Pravarta, Karčiupis, Praviena, Nizra, Nedėja.

Deforestation 
On 12 June 2019 Lithuanian parliament approved plans for Gaižiūnai forest deforestation in Rukla Eldership. Project affects 0.4395 km2 that is going to be turned into military training camp for NATO forces that are currently residing in a nreaby town of Rukla.

References

Forests of Lithuania
Jonava District Municipality
Kaišiadorys District Municipality